Burghild Wieczorek (4 May 1943 – 28 November 2016) was a German athlete. She competed in the women's long jump at the 1968 Summer Olympics.

References

External links
 

1943 births
2016 deaths
Athletes (track and field) at the 1968 Summer Olympics
German female long jumpers
Olympic athletes of East Germany
Place of birth missing